The 2003–04 Sussex County Football League season was the 79th in the history of Sussex County Football League a football competition in England.

Division One

Division One featured 16 clubs which competed in the division last season, along with four new clubs.
Clubs promoted from Division Two:
East Grinstead Town
Eastbourne Town
Rye & Iden United
Plus:
St Leonards, relegated from the Southern League

St Leonards resigned from the league January 2004 and their playing record of P21 W7 D4 L10 GF32 GA35 P25 was expunged.

League table

Division Two

Division Two featured 12 clubs which competed in the division last season, along with six new clubs.
Clubs relegated from Division One:
Littlehampton Town
Peacehaven & Telscombe
Wick
Clubs promoted from Division Three:
Haywards Heath Town
Midhurst & Easebourne
Plus:
Eastbourne United Association, formed as merger of Eastbourne United and Shinewater Association

League table

Division Three

Division Three featured 13 clubs which competed in the division last season, along with one new club:
Wadhurst United, joined from the East Sussex League

Also, Ifield merged with Edwards Sports to form Ifield Edwards.

League table

References

2003-04
2003–04 in English football leagues